Bolsterstone is a village in South Yorkshire, England, south of Stocksbridge, and 8.5 miles to the northwest of the City of Sheffield and within the city borough. It lies on the border of the Peak District national park. Bolsterstone had a population of 386 in 2011.

Geography and history
Bolsterstone is less than 1 km south of the town of Stocksbridge within the civil parish of Stocksbridge, and the electoral ward of Stocksbridge and Upper Don.

The origin of the name "Bolsterstone" is unknown; it may a corruption of the root word "Walder" (also used in local place names, including a barrow), or may refer to two large stones in the village, which are referred to as the "Bolster Stones". The village is thought to have been established in the Anglo-Saxon period. St Mary's Church was founded in 1412, and a fortified manor house ("Bolsterstone Castle") is thought to have been built by an Earl of Shrewsbury. Two buildings dating from the 16th or 17th century are thought to be remnants of the castle: Castle Cottages are mostly 19th-century with parts of walls dating from the earlier period; Porters Lodge, also mostly 19th-century, is thought to contain elements of the castle gatehouse.

A Free School was built in the village in 1686 (rebuilt 1780). Land around the village was enclosed after 1778, and St. Mary's church was rebuilt in the 1790s.

The Castle Inn was built in 1840; Bolsterstone National School in 1851/2 and the Free School rebuilt in 1857; and a vicarage built in 1862; between 1872 and 1879 St Mary's church was again rebuilt.

As of 2009 the village functions as a residential village; the village has no shops, and both schools have closed; the National School building is used as a village hall.

The Peak District Boundary Walk runs through the village.

People
Three first-class cricketers were born in Bolsterstone: the brothers Clem, Rowland and Rockley Wilson.

References

Sources

Literature

External links

 Sources for the history of Bolsterstone Produced by Sheffield City Council's Libraries and Archives

See also
Listed buildings in Stocksbridge

Stocksbridge
Villages of the metropolitan borough of Sheffield
Towns and villages of the Peak District